Dimensional Fund Advisors, L.P. (branded Dimensional abbreviated DFA) is a private investment firm headquartered in Austin, Texas. Dimensional was founded in Chicago in 1981 by David Booth, Rex Sinquefield and Larry Klotz. The company has affiliates within 13 offices in the U.S., Canada, U.K., Germany, Netherlands, Australia, Singapore, and Japan. Dimensional maintains U.S. offices in Charlotte, North Carolina and Santa Monica, California and has affiliate offices globally. The company is owned by its employees, board members and outside investors. 

The company’s founders studied at the University of Chicago under Eugene Fama and Kenneth French. DFA's investment strategy is based on application of the efficient market hypothesis. Dimensional was one of the earliest firms to offer passive investing and "runs the oldest small-cap index fund" in the United States. However, DFA's versions of index funds skew towards smaller company stocks and value stocks, and thus operate differently from most index funds which are weighted by market capitalization. This strategy results in regulators, such as the SEC, and some analysts describing  the funds as actively managed. The company offers equity and fixed income mutual funds and Exchange-traded funds.

In 2009, Dimensional acquired SmartNest, a retirement planning computer software company. Researcher Robert C. Merton left SmartNest's board after the purchase and became a Resident Scientist at Dimensional.

In November 2020, the company announced it was abandoning its strictly advisor-access only mutual fund business model by offering openly-accessed exchange-traded funds.

References

External links 
Official site
Fama/French Forum
David Booth Interviews

Investment management companies of the United States
Financial services companies established in 1981
Companies based in Austin, Texas